Diving at the 2018 Asian Games was held at the Gelora Bung Karno Aquatic Stadium, Jakarta, Indonesia from 28 August to 1 September 2018.

China dominated the competition by winning all the ten gold medals available.

Schedule

Medalists

Men

Women

Medal table

Participating nations
A total of 80 athletes from 14 nations competed in diving at the 2018 Asian Games:

References

External links
Diving at the 2018 Asian Games
Official Result Book – Diving (Archived version)

 
2018 in diving
2018
2018 Asian Games events
2018 Asian Games
International aquatics competitions hosted by Indonesia